Xylosma pachyphylla, commonly known as spiny logwood, is a species of flowering plant in the family Salicaceae, that is endemic to Puerto Rico. It can be found in forests on the island's western mountains, where it grows in serpentine soils. It is threatened by habitat loss.

References

pachyphylla
Endemic flora of Puerto Rico
Critically endangered plants
Taxonomy articles created by Polbot